Mitophyllus parrianus, is a species of stag beetle native to New Zealand.  M. parrianus is found throughout the North, South and Stewart Islands of New Zealand.

References 

Lucaninae
Beetles of New Zealand
Beetles described in 1863
Endemic fauna of New Zealand
Endemic insects of New Zealand